Dace Munča is a Latvian curler.

She was alternate for the Latvian team at the 2010 Ford World Women's Curling Championship in Swift Current, Canada. She also represented Latvia at the 2013 World Women's Curling Championship at home in Riga, Latvia, finishing in last place with a 1-10 record.

References

External links
 

Latvian female curlers
Living people
Year of birth missing (living people)
21st-century Latvian women